Railway Station metro station is a metro station on the Pink Line of the Jaipur Metro in Jaipur, Rajasthan, India. It was opened on 3 June 2015. It connects to Jaipur Junction railway station.

Station layout

Connections
Jaipur Junction railway station

See also
Blue
List of Jaipur Metro stations
Jaipur BRTS
List of rapid transit systems in India
List of Metro Systems
Rajasthan State Road Transport Corporation

References

External links
 UrbanRail.Net — descriptions of all metro systems in the world, each with a schematic map showing all stations.

2015 establishments in Rajasthan
Jaipur Metro stations